Tigist Tufa (born 26 January 1987) is an Ethiopian marathon runner.

She was the winner of the 2014 Shanghai Marathon, setting a new course record and a personal best time of 2:21:52. Her previous bests were 2:28:04 at the Los Angeles Marathon in 2013, followed by 2:24:32 at the 2014 Ottawa Marathon, where she also set a new course record.

She won the 2015 London Marathon in a time of 2:23:22, making her the first female Ethiopian to win the race in 14 years. The last Ethiopian to win the race was Deratu Tulu in 2001.

References

External links

1987 births
Living people
Place of birth missing (living people)
Ethiopian female marathon runners
Ethiopian female long-distance runners
World Athletics Championships athletes for Ethiopia
London Marathon female winners
Athletes (track and field) at the 2016 Summer Olympics
Olympic athletes of Ethiopia
21st-century Ethiopian women